Curtez Dominic Kellman (born 6 March 1998) is a Guyanese professional footballer who plays as a defender and midfielder for the Guyana national team.

Club career 
Kellman began his career at Georgetown FC in the 2015–16 season. He went on to play for Grenades FC in Antigua and Barbuda before returning to Georgetown FC in 2017. Kellman later signed for Western Tigers.

College career 
Kellman began his college soccer career at Eastern Florida State College, where he earned a full two-year scholarship following a successful try-out.

In the 2019 season, Kellman played in 19 matches for Eastern Florida. He scored one goal on the season, in a 4–0 win over Laramie County Community College. However, due to the financial impact of the COVID-19 pandemic, Kellman lost his scholarship at Eastern Florida.  He was subsequently offered a scholarship by Daytona State College.

On 15 January 2021, he officially secured a scholarship to play at Daytona State. The 2020 season was postponed to the spring of 2021 due to the pandemic, and Kellman made his debut for Daytona State on 2 April 2021 in a 0–0 draw against Georgia Military College. His first goal came on 22 May in a 7–0 win vs. University of South Carolina-Lancaster.  He went on to make 11 appearances in his first season with Daytona State.

Professional career 
Kellman was one of 17 trialists who joined MLS Next Pro side Sporting Kansas City II during preseason in 2022.

Kellman was then signed by SKC II ahead of the 2022 season.

International career 
Curtez made his international debut for Guyana on 25 November 2017 in a friendly against Indonesia, coming on as an early sub in the 16th minute.

References 

1998 births
Living people
Sportspeople from Georgetown, Guyana
Guyanese footballers
Association football defenders
Association football midfielders
Guyana international footballers
Georgetown FC players
Grenades F.C. players
Western Tigers FC players
EFSC Titans men's soccer players
Guyanese expatriate footballers
Guyanese expatriate sportspeople in Antigua and Barbuda
Expatriate footballers in Antigua and Barbuda
Guyanese expatriate sportspeople in the United States
Expatriate soccer players in the United States
Sporting Kansas City II players
MLS Next Pro players